Livov is a village and municipality in Bardejov District in the Prešov Region of north-east Slovakia.

History
In historical records the village was first mentioned in 1600

Geography
The municipality lies at an altitude of 510 meters (1,675 feet) and covers an area of 26.37 km2 (10.2 miles2).
It has a population of about 74 (31. 12. 2018) .

Gallery

External links
 
https://web.archive.org/web/20070427022352/http://www.statistics.sk/mosmis/eng/run.html

Villages and municipalities in Bardejov District
Šariš